In software engineering, SOLID is a mnemonic acronym for five design principles intended to make object-oriented designs more understandable, flexible, and maintainable. The principles are a subset of many principles promoted by American software engineer and instructor Robert C. Martin, first introduced in his 2000 paper Design Principles and Design Patterns discussing software rot.

The SOLID ideas are

 The Single-responsibility principle: "There should never be more than one reason for a class to change." In other words, every class should have only one responsibility.
 The Open–closed principle: "Software entities ... should be open for extension, but closed for modification."
 The Liskov substitution principle: "Functions that use pointers or references to base classes must be able to use objects of derived classes without knowing it." See also design by contract.
 The Interface segregation principle: "Clients should not be forced to depend upon interfaces that they do not use."
 The Dependency inversion principle: "Depend upon abstractions, [not] concretions."

The SOLID acronym was introduced later, around 2004, by Michael Feathers.

Although the SOLID principles apply to any object-oriented design, they can also form a core philosophy for methodologies such as agile development or adaptive software development.

See also
 Code reuse
 GRASP (object-oriented design)
 Inheritance (object-oriented programming)
 List of software development philosophies

References

Software design
Object-oriented programming
Programming principles

de:Prinzipien objektorientierten Designs#SOLID-Prinzipien